Port-la-Nouvelle is a commune in the Aude department in southern France.

Population

See also
 Corbières AOC
 Communes of the Aude department

References

External links

Official site
 Port-la-Nouvelle guide

Communes of Aude
Languedoc
Aude communes articles needing translation from French Wikipedia
Populated coastal places in France